Presidential elections were held in Ecuador in 1901. The result was a victory for Leónidas Plaza, who received 89% of the vote.

Results

References

Presidential elections in Ecuador
Ecuador
1901 in Ecuador
Election and referendum articles with incomplete results